Greenalite is a mineral in the kaolinite-serpentine group with the chemical composition (Fe2+,Fe3+)2-3Si2O5(OH)4. It is a member of the serpentine group.

Occurrence
Greenalite was first described in 1903 for an occurrence in the Mesabi Range near Biwabik, St. Louis County, Minnesota and named for its green color. 

Greenalite occurs as a primary phase in banded iron formations. Rocks which contain greenalite are usually bright green, pale green or pale brown.  Greenalite occurs with quartz, stilpnomelane, siderite, chamosite, pyrite and minnesotaite. It is commonly oolitic.

References

Phyllosilicates
Monoclinic minerals
Minerals in space group 8